Acyrtus is a genus of clingfishes found in the western Atlantic Ocean.

Species
There are currently 4 recognized species in this genus:
 Acyrtus artius Briggs, 1955 (Papillate clingfish)
 Acyrtus lanthanum Conway, C. C. Baldwin & M. D. White, 2014 (Orange-spotted clingfish) 
 Acyrtus pauciradiatus C. L. S. Sampaio, Nunes & L. F. Mendes, 2004
 Acyrtus rubiginosus Poey, 1868 (Red clingfish)

References

Gobiesocidae